Hwang Ji-man (Hangul: 황지만; ; born 8 July 1984) is a badminton player from South Korea.

Career
Hwang started playing badminton when he was in Miryang elementary school, and when he was 17, Hwang was chosen to represent the National Junior team.
Hwang played at the 2007 BWF World Championships in men's doubles with Lee Jae-jin. They were seeded 10 and were defeated in the third round by Candra Wijaya and Tony Gunawan, 21–17, 21–16.

In Beijing 2008 Summer Olympics, Hwang and his partner Lee won their first bronze medal after upsetting Choong Tan Fook/Lee Wan Wah in the first round, Tadashi Ohtsuka/Keita Masuda in the quarter-final, but defeated by Cai Yun and Fu Haifeng of China in the semifinal. Nevertheless, in the bronze medal match, Hwang and Lee subdued Danish Lars Paaske and Jonas Rasmussen.

Achievements

Olympic Games
Men's doubles

Asia Championships 
Men's doubles

Asian Junior Championships
Boys' singles

Boys' doubles

Mixed doubles

BWF Superseries  
The BWF Superseries, launched on 14 December 2006 and implemented in 2007, is a series of elite badminton tournaments, sanctioned by Badminton World Federation (BWF). BWF Superseries has two level such as Superseries and Superseries Premier. A season of Superseries features twelve tournaments around the world, which introduced since 2011, with successful players invited to the Superseries Finals held at the year end.

Men's doubles

 BWF Superseries Finals tournament
 BWF Superseries Premier tournament
 BWF Superseries tournament

BWF Grand Prix 
The BWF Grand Prix has two level such as Grand Prix and Grand Prix Gold. It is a series of badminton tournaments, sanctioned by Badminton World Federation (BWF) since 2007. The World Badminton Grand Prix has been sanctioned by the International Badminton Federation since 1983.

Men's doubles

Mixed doubles

 BWF Grand Prix Gold tournament
 BWF & IBF Grand Prix tournament

BWF International Challenge/Series
Men's doubles

Mixed doubles

 BWF International Challenge tournament
 BWF International Series tournament

References

External links
 
 
 Hwang Ji-man at www.internationalbadminton.org
 Hwang Ji-man at www.doha-2006.com

South Korean male badminton players
1984 births
Living people
People from Miryang
Badminton players at the 2008 Summer Olympics
Olympic badminton players of South Korea
Olympic bronze medalists for South Korea
Olympic medalists in badminton
Medalists at the 2008 Summer Olympics
Asian Games medalists in badminton
Asian Games silver medalists for South Korea
Badminton players at the 2006 Asian Games
Medalists at the 2006 Asian Games
Sportspeople from South Gyeongsang Province